The Kharaulakh Range is a range of mountains in far North-eastern Russia. Administratively the range is part of the Sakha Republic of the Russian Federation. The area of the range is largely uninhabited.

Geography
The Kharaulakh Range is located by the Lena River in its last stretch before its delta. The Chekanovsky Ridge rises above the facing bank of the Lena. It is one of the subranges of the northern end of the Verkhoyansk Range, part of the East Siberian System of mountains. the Orulgan Range, a higher mountain chain, stretches to the south.

The Kharaulakh Range has two subranges running parallel to the main mountain chain, the Tuora-Sis Range to the west by the shores of the Lena, and the Kunga Range at the eastern flank. The highest point of the range is an unnamed peak reaching .

See also
Ust-Vilyuy Range

References

External links

Mountain ranges of Russia
Verkhoyansk Range

ceb:Kharaulakhskiy Khrebet